is a highly eccentric, stony asteroid, classified as near-Earth object and potentially hazardous asteroid, approximately half a kilometer in diameter. It was discovered on 16 July 1991, by American astronomer Henry E. Holt at the U.S. Palomar Observatory in California.

Orbit and classification 

The S-type body is an Amor asteroid – a subgroup of near-Earth asteroids that approach the orbit of Earth from beyond, but do not cross it. It orbits the Sun at a distance of 1.0–4.0 AU once every 3 years and 11 months (1,444 days). Its orbit has an eccentricity of 0.59 and an inclination of 6° with respect to the ecliptic.

A first precovery was taken at the Australian Siding Spring Observatory in March 1991, extending the asteroid's observation arc by 4 months prior to its discovery.

Physical characteristics 

In 2000, a rotational lightcurve was published from photometric observations obtained by the Near-Earth Objects Follow-up Program during the early 1990s. The lightcurve rendered a rotation period of 2.69 hours with an brightness amplitude of 0.08 in magnitude. The Collaborative Asteroid Lightcurve Link (CALL) assumes an albedo of 0.20 and derives a diameter of 0.53 kilometers, based on an absolute magnitude of 18.77.

Naming 

As of 2017,  remains unnamed.

References

External links 
 Asteroid Lightcurve Database (LCDB), query form (info )
 Dictionary of Minor Planet Names, Google books
 Asteroids and comets rotation curves, CdR – Observatoire de Genève, Raoul Behrend
 
 
 

006491
Discoveries by Henry E. Holt
006491
19910716